This is a list of members of the 38th Legislative Assembly of Queensland from 1966 to 1969, as elected at the 1966 state election held on 28 May 1966.

 On 14 March 1967, the Country member for Roma, William Ewan, died.  Country candidate Ken Tomkins won the resulting by-election on 24 June 1967.
 On 13 February 1968, the Country member for Landsborough and Premier of Queensland, Frank Nicklin, resigned. Country candidate Mike Ahern won the resulting by-election on 16 March 1968.
 On 31 July 1968, the Country member for Isis and Premier of Queensland, Jack Pizzey, died. Labor candidate Jim Blake won the resulting by-election on 16 November 1968.

See also
1966 Queensland state election
Nicklin Ministry (Country/Liberal) (1957–1968)
Pizzey Ministry (Country/Liberal) (17 January–31 July 1968)
Chalk Ministry (Liberal/Country) (1–8 August 1968)
Bjelke-Petersen Ministry (Country/Liberal) (1968–1987)

References

 

Members of Queensland parliaments by term
20th-century Australian politicians